George Jackson may refer to:

People

Politics
George Jackson (Australian politician) (1856–1938), member of the Queensland Legislative Assembly
George Jackson (Canadian politician) (1808–1885), Canadian mill operator, MP from Ontario
George Jackson (Irish politician) (1761–1805), Member of Parliament for Mayo 1801–1802
Sir George Duckett, 1st Baronet (1725–1822), born George Jackson, British politician and MP
George Jackson (Virginia politician) (1757–1831), U.S. Representative from Virginia
Sir George Jackson, 1st Baronet, of Fort Hill (1770–1846), Anglo-Irish Member of Parliament 
George H. Jackson (politician), Ohio state representative
George W. Jackson (politician) (born 1924), Pennsylvania politician
George Jackson (activist) (1941–1971), American Black Panther, prisoner, and author

Sports
George Jackson (baseball) (1882–1972), American Major League Baseball player
George Jackson (cricketer) (fl. mid-18th century), English cricketer
George Jackson (footballer, born 1952), English footballer
George Jackson (footballer, born 1893) (1893–1985), English footballer
George Jackson (footballer, born 1987), Brazilian footballer, full name George Jackson dos Santos Souza

Entertainment
George Jackson (animator) (1920–1986), British animator
George Jackson (music producer) (born 1969), American music producer, DJ, and remixer
George Jackson (filmmaker) (1958–2000), American film producer
George Jackson (songwriter) (1945–2013), American songwriter, singer and musician
George O. Jackson Jr. (born 1941), photographer

Science
George Jackson (botanist) (1790–1811), English botanist
George Jackson (chemist) (born 1962), British chemist

Other people

George Jackson (plasterwork) (1766–1840), British plasterwork innovator
George Jackson (British Army officer) (1876–1958)
George H. Jackson (diplomat), American lawyer, consul, and political activist
George W. Jackson (developer) (born 1952), American real estate developer
George Pullen Jackson (1874–1953), American educator and musicologist
George Holbrook Jackson (1874–1948), British journalist and author

Other uses
George Jackson (Brookside), a character on UK soap opera Brookside
"George Jackson" (song), a 1971 song by Bob Dylan

See also
George Jackson Churchward (1857–1933), GWR railway engineer